The 9th Annual Nickelodeon Kids' Choice Awards was held on May 11, 1996, at Universal Studios Hollywood. Whitney Houston hosted the ceremony with Rosie O'Donnell co-hosting via satellite from a New York Harbor cruise, and Mark Curry served as a guest announcer. Houston became the first celebrity to host more than one Kids' Choice Awards.

Performers

Winners and nominees
Winners are listed first, in bold. Other nominees are in alphabetical order.

Movies

Television

Music

Sports

Miscellaneous

Special Recognition

Hall of Fame
 Tim Allen
 Whoopi Goldberg
 Whitney Houston
 Janet Jackson

References

Nickelodeon Kids' Choice Awards
Kids' Choice Awards
Kids' Choice Awards
Kids' Choice Awards
Kids